Minsk is the capital of Belarus.

Minsk may refer to:

Places
Minsk National Airport
Mińsk Mazowiecki, a town in Masovian Voivodeship, the seat of Mińsk County, Poland

Technology
Minsk family of computers, a Soviet computer system
Soviet aircraft carrier Minsk
Soviet destroyer Minsk
RFS Minsk, a Ropucha-class landing ship in the Russian Navy
Minsk (motorcycle), a Belarusian motorcycle brand

Other meanings
The Minsk, informal name of Anshei Minsk synagogue in Toronto which was founded by Russian Jewish emigrants from Minsk
3012 Minsk, an Outer Main-belt Asteroid
Minsk (band), an American post-metal band
The Minsk Protocol is an agreement which sought to end war in the Donbas region of Ukraine

See also
Minsc, a Baldur's Gate videogame character